Filipinas Broadcasting Network is a Philippine radio network. Its corporate office is located at Rm. 306, Legaspi Towers 200 Bldg., Paseo de Roxas Ave., Makati.

FBN Stations

FM Stations

AM Stations

Former Stations

References

Radio stations in the Philippines
Philippine radio networks